Ulugöz is a village in Silifke district of Mersin Province, Turkey. The population of Ulugöz is 830 as of 2011. Major economic activity of the village is farming . Green house vegetables and strawberries are the main crops.

References

Villages in Silifke District